The Cork Premier Intermediate Hurling Championship (known for sponsorship reasons as the Co-Op Superstores Cork Premier Intermediate Hurling Championship and abbreviated to the Cork PIHC) is an annual hurling competition organised by the Cork County Board of the Gaelic Athletic Association and contested by the top-ranking intermediate clubs in the county of Cork in Ireland. It is the third tier overall in the entire Cork hurling championship system.

The Cork Premier Intermediate Championship was introduced in 2004 following a split in the existing Cork Intermediate Hurling Championship. At the time of its creation it was the second tier of Cork hurling.

In its soon-to-be introduced format, the Cork Premier Intermediate Championship will begin in April. The 12 participating club teams will be drawn into three groups of four teams and play each other in a round-robin system. The three group winners and the three runners-up proceed to the knockout phase that culminates with the final match at Páirc Uí Rinn in October. The winner of the Cork Premier Intermediate Championship, as well as being presented with the Séamus Long Cup, qualifies for the subsequent Munster Club Championship.

The competition has been won by 17 teams. Ballinhassig, Blarney and Courcey Rovers are the only teams to have won the tournament on more than one occasion. Inniscarra are the current holders beating Castlemartyr by 3-12 to 1-17 in the 2022 final.

History
The Cork Intermediate Championship was founded in 1909 in an effort to bridge the standard of play between the Cork Senior Championship and the Cork Junior Championship. For almost a century, the Cork Intermediate Championship was effectively the second tier championship in the Cork hurling championship system.

In 2003 the Cork County Board Executive established a Hurling Championship Review Committee in an effort to improve the competitiveness of the Cork Senior Championship. The committee also proposed the splitting of the existing Cork Intermediate Championship in two with the creation of a 16-team Cork Premier Intermediate Championship which became the second tier of the Cork hurling championship system.

The championship was first played in 2004 with the winner, St. Catherine's, gaining automatic promotion to the following year's Cork Senior Championship. Their place in the championship was taken by Watergrasshill who won the Cork Intermediate Championship. The idea of relegation was introduced in 2006 with St. Finbarr's becoming the first team to be relegated from the championship after losing a play-off to Ballincollig. Similarly, Delaney Rovers became the first team to be relegated to the championship after losing their senior status following a play-off defeat by Castlelyons. Relegation was suspended in 2013 and again from 2015 to 2019.

Format

History
16 clubs entered the inaugural championship in 2004 and a double elimination format was used. Each team was guaranteed at least two games before being eliminated from the championship. In 2006 a relegation section was introduced. The four teams who lost both their games in Round 1 and Round 2 entered the relegation play-offs with the eventual losing team being relegated. An extra round of games was added to the championship in 2010. Each team was now given the opportunity of losing both of their games in Round 1 and Round 2 but remaining in the championship. This format remained in place until 2016 when it was decided to revert to the previous format.

Current

Development
On 2 April 2019, a majority of 136 club delegates voted to restructure the championship once again. The new format also led to a reduction in the number of participating clubs from 16 to 12.

Overview
Group stage: The 12 club teams are divided into three groups of four. Over the course of the group stage, which features one game in April and two games in August, each team plays once against the others in the group, resulting in each team being guaranteed at least three games. Two points are awarded for a win, one for a draw and zero for a loss. The teams are ranked in the group stage table by points gained, then scoring difference and then their head-to-head record. The top two teams in each group qualify for the knockout stage, with the two best-placed teams receiving byes to the semi-finals.

Quarter-finals: Two lone quarter-finals feature the four lowest-placed team from the group stage. Two teams qualify for the next round.

Semi-finals: The two semi-finals feature four teams. Two teams qualify for the next round.

Final: The two semi-final winners contest the final. The winning team are declared champions and gain automatic promotion to the following year's Cork Senior A Championship.

2023 Teams

Sponsorship
Permanent TSB became the first title sponsor of the championship, serving in that capacity for just one year until 2005 when the Evening Echo signed a sponsorship deal. In 2020, Dairygold Co-Op Superstores were unveiled as the new title sponsor of the Cork Premier Intermediate Championship.

Venues

Early rounds

Fixtures in the opening rounds of the championship are usually played at a neutral venue that is deemed halfway between the participating teams. Some of the more common venues include Clonmult Memorial Park, Páirc Shéamuis de Barra, St. Catherine's Park, Church Road and Páirc Liam Mhic Cárthaigh.

Final
The final has always been played at one of Cork GAA's two main stadiums. On several occasions the final has been played at Páirc Uí Chaoimh as the curtain raiser to the senior final. The rebuilding and subsequent improvement works to Páirc Uí Chaoimh resulted in several finals being held at Páirc Uí Rinn.

Managers
Managers in the Cork Championship are involved in the day-to-day running of the team, including the training, team selection, and sourcing of players. Their influence varies from club-to-club and is related to the individual club committees. The manager is assisted by a team of two or three selectors and a backroom team consisting of various coaches.

Trophy
The winning team is presented with the Séamus Long Cup. A national school teacher by profession, Séamus Long (1884-1953) was elected secretary of the Ballincollig club in 1914, before serving as the first secretary of the Muskerry Board in 1924. A founder-member of the Ballinora club the same year, he was the club's first chairman. Long also served as vice-chairman of the Cork County Board and was a Munster Council delegate from 1949 until his death in 1953.

List of finals

Roll of honour

By Division

Records and statistics

Teams
The following is a list of teams who have played in the Cork Premier Intermediate Hurling Championship since its formation in 2004 to the current championships season. As of the 2020 season, 31 teams have played in the Cork Premier Intermediate Hurling Championship.

All statistics here refer to time in the Cork Premier Intermediate Hurling Championship only, with the exception of 'Most Recent Finish' (which refers to all levels of play). Cork Premier Intermediate Hurling Championship teams playing in the 2020 championship season are indicated in bold. A 'spell' refers to a number of consecutive seasons within the championship, uninterrupted by relegation. If the longest spell is the current spell, this is shown in bold.

Final

Team
Most wins: 2: 
Ballinhassig (2005, 2012), Blarney (2008, 2020) and Courcey Rovers (2011, 2021)
Most appearances in a final: 3:
Courcey Rovers (2004, 2008, 2018)
Biggest win: 18 points
 Newcestown 1-23 - 0-08 Valley Rovers, (2015)
Most goals in a final: 6
 Carrigtwohill 3-14 - 3-12 Watergrasshill, (2007)
Most points in a final: 36
 Douglas 0-20 - 0-16 Ballymartle, (2009)
Most goals by a winning side: 3
 Carrigtwohill 3-14 - 3-12 Watergrasshill, (2007)
Most goals by a losing side: 3
 Watergrasshill 3-12 - 3-14 Carrigtwohill, (2007)
Most points by a winning side: 23
 Newcestown 1-23 - 0-08 Valley Rovers, (2015)
Most points by a losing side: 16
 Ballymartle 0-16 - 0-20 Douglas, (2009)
 Newcestown 0-16 - 1-17 Ballyhea, (2014)
Highest cumulative score overall: 44
 Carrigtwohill 3-14 - 3-12 Watergrasshill, (2007)
Highest cumulative score by a winning team: 26
 Newcestown 1-23 - 0-08 Valley Rovers, (2015)
Highest cumulative score by a losing team: 21
 Watergrasshill 3-12 - 3-14 Carrigtwohill, (2007)
Most defeats: 2
Courcey Rovers (2004, 2008, 2018)

Top scorers

All time

By season

Overall

Single game

In finals

Cumulative

Individual

References

 
1
Intermediate hurling county championships